Robert Burton (1577-1640) was an English writer and fellow of Oxford University, best known for his encyclopedic book The Anatomy of Melancholy.

Robert Burton may also refer to:

Academics
 Robert Burton (academic), Master of University College, Oxford, England (1420–1423/4)

Sports
 Robert Burton (athlete) (1885–1950), British track and field athlete
 Bob Burton (basketball) (born 1945), American basketball coach
 Claude Burton (cricketer) (1891–1971), full name Robert Claude Burton
 Robert Burton (cricketer, born 1943), Trinidadian-born former English cricketer
 Robbie Burton (footballer) (born 1999)

Politicians
 Robert Burton (MP), Member of Parliament for Great Grimsby 1380-97
 Robert Burton (American politician) (1747–1825), North Carolina politician and American Revolution officer
 Robert Burton-Chadwick (1869–1951), English shipping magnate and politician
 Rob Burton, Canadian mayor

Others
 Bob Burton Jr. (born 1985), American speedcuber
 Robert Burton (actor) (1895–1962), American film and television actor
 Robert A. Burton, American physician, novelist, nonfiction author and columnist
 Robert T. Burton (1821–1907), Canadian religious leader
 Robert Burton, pseudonym of Nathaniel Crouch (c. 1640–1725?), English writer
 Robbie Burton (publisher)

See also
 Burton (name)